Miye Matsukata (January 27, 1922 – February 16, 1981), sometimes written as Miyé Matsukata, was a Japanese-born American jewelry designer based in Boston, Massachusetts. She was one of the founders of Atelier Janiye and later became the sole owner.

Early life
Miye Matsukata was born in Tokyo. Her parents had both lived in the United States before her birth. Her mother, Miyo Arai, was born in New York into a family with silk importing business, owned by her father, Arai Ryoichiro. Miye's father was Shokuma Matsukata, who was part of the Matsukata family.

Her paternal grandfather was Matsukata Masayoshi, Prime Minister of Japan from 1891 to 1892 and from 1896 to 1898; her sisters were Haru M. Reischauer, a writer and wife of the diplomat and scholar Edwin O. Reischauer, and Tané Matsukata, founder of the Nishimachi International School. An uncle, Kōjirō Matsukata, was a major collector of Western art in Tokyo. Another uncle, Saburō Matsukata, was a Japanese alpinist.

Miye and her siblings grew up in a bifurcated culture. She spent her youth in Tokyo, Japan, but was under strong influence by Western culture and education. Miye and her siblings studied at Principia College, in Illinois. Four of the children including Miye, remained in United States after.

Miye Matsukata majored in fine arts at Principia College in Illinois from 1940-1944. She would then attend the School of the Museum of Fine Arts, Boston, focusing her study on metalsmith and graduating in 1949. During her graduate studies she traveled on scholarship in Scandinavia.

Career
Matsukata designed jewelry in Boston, and established Atelier Janiye (sometimes written as Atelier Janiyé) in the 1949, co-owned with Naomi Katz Harris and Janice Whipple Williams after graduating. The name 'Janiye' originated from the combinations of the three designers first name. In 1958, the group association disbanded and Matsukata took sole ownership of Atelier Janiye. James Hubbard was the business manager and agent, while Nancy Michel, Alexandra Watkins, and Yoshiko Yamamoto created the jewelry based on designs by Matsukata.

She was awarded another travel grant to study goldsmithing techniques in the Middle East and in Greece in 1966. In 1968, she organized an exhibition of new American art jewelry at the Odakyu Department Store in Tokyo. She was also involved in the Society of North American Goldsmiths.  She taught several classes at the Haystack Mountain School of Crafts in Deer Isle, Maine in 1976.

Her works was characterized by a mix of media, using beads, stones, coins, glass, enamel, fabric, and other materials in addition to unconventional uses of gold or silver. "Unlike much of the found object jewelry made during the 1960s and '70s," observes one scholar, "Matsukata's work did not celebrate cast-off goods, invoke shamanic tradition, or make sly pop cultural references."

Her work is included in the collection of the Smithsonian American Art Museum.

Death and legacy 
Matsukata faced an unexpected death in 1981 from meningitis at the age of 59. Her papers, including sketchbooks, journals, business records, correspondence, and photographs, are in the Archives of American Art, Smithsonian Institution.

Atelier Janiye continued as a jewelry studio under Matsukata's associates, Nancy Michel and Alexandra Solowij Watkins, until they retired in 2014. In 2011 a show featuring and inspired by her work, "Atelier Janiyé: And the Legacy of Master Jeweler Miyé Matsukata", was exhibited at the Fuller Craft Museum.

References

External links 
Miye Matsukata at Smithsonian American Art Museum

Miye Matsukata papers, circa 1900-1982, bulk 1964-1981 at Archives of American Art, Smithsonian Institution

1922 births
1981 deaths
Japanese women artists
Japanese artists
American artists of Japanese descent
American women artists
Jewellery designers
Metalsmiths
Goldsmiths
Miye
Japanese emigrants to the United States
Artists from Tokyo